Rascon or Rascón is a surname. Notable people with the surname include:

Alfred V. Rascon, United States Army soldier and Medal of Honor recipient
Art Rascon (born 1962), American television news anchor
Miguel Rascón (born 1972), Mexican guitarist
Tati Rascón (born 1971), Spanish tennis player

Spanish-language surnames